Rolin B. Jones (born September 22, 1972) is an American playwright and television writer. His plays include The Intelligent Design of Jenny Chow, for which he was a 2006 Pulitzer Prize finalist, The Jammer, which first appeared at the New York Fringe Festival and features a hilarious dedication to the original lead actor, Kevin Rich, and Sovereignty. His work in television includes Showtime's Weeds and United States of Tara, NBC drama Friday Night Lights, HBO's Boardwalk Empire and Perry Mason, and AMC's Anne Rice's Interview with the Vampire, for which he serves as showrunner.

Jones joined the crew of Friday Night Lights as a writer and supervising producer for the series fourth season in 2009 and wrote the episodes "The Son" and "Laboring". He was nominated for two Writers Guild of America Award for Best Drama Series for his work on the series and received a 2010 Emmy Award nomination for Outstanding Writing for a Drama Series for the episode "The Son". 

Jones grew up in the Woodland Hills area of Los Angeles, California,
and graduated from El Camino Real High School in 1990. He studied filmmaking and English at Cal State Northridge and graduated from the Yale School of Drama in 2004.

References

External links
 

Living people
1972 births
21st-century American dramatists and playwrights
American television writers
American male television writers
Yale School of Drama alumni
American male dramatists and playwrights
21st-century American male writers
El Camino Real High School alumni
Screenwriters from California
21st-century American screenwriters